The Black Friars of Shrewsbury is a short historical book by Paul Marsden, the former Shrewsbury MP, about the Dominican friars who arrived in Shrewsbury, England, in 1230 and built a church, cloisters, Lady chapel and series of outbuildings.

Book content
In 1221 St. Dominic, aged 51 years, died in Bologna, Italy. St. Dominic was revered for performing various miracles and caring for the poor and the sick. He was elected several times as bishop, but refused the position and preferred to stay among his fellow brethren. His Dominican friars moved freely among the citizenry spreading the word of God and helping those in need. 

Henry III enthusiastically supported the friars in their quest to build a church in Shrewsbury, and from 1232 until the king's death in 1272, regularly gave orders to support the construction.

On the eve of the Battle of Shrewsbury in 1403, Prince Henry (later Henry V) stayed at the friary. The Dominican Church in England was split between the Welsh rebels and Henry IV, but the Shrewsbury friary remained loyal to the king and provided a safe haven for the prince. Following the battle, many of the noblemen who died on the battlefield were taken back to the friary and buried in its grounds.

Edward IV accompanied his pregnant wife Queen Elizabeth (Woodville) to the Shrewsbury friary in 1473. On 17 August, Richard was born. He became one of the Princes of the Tower, Richard of Shrewsbury and disappeared in the Tower of London together with his older brother King Edward V. Their uncle, Richard III was blamed for their disappearance.

The friary continued to serve the local Shropshire community, dispensing spiritual and medical help to local Salopians during its 300-year existence. However, on or around 29 September 1538, on Henry VIII's orders, the friary was forced to close and the friars were thrown out onto the streets of Shropshire.

On 25 April 1539, it was reported that a plate of "Black fryers in Shrewesbury" had been delivered to the royal treasury by Thomas Thacker. All of the stonework was torn down and sold off.

Minor excavations were carried out in the 19th century, 1970s and 1990s. A bishop's chalice, floor tiles and numerous skeletons were found. Little remains above ground which is covered by the modern Blackfriars apartments. Boxes containing parts of the skeletons are stored in the basement of Rowley's House Museum in Shrewsbury together with various artefacts.

See also
 Aquinas and the Sacraments
 Cestui que
 Dissolution of the Monasteries
 Dominican Order
 English Reformation
 Henry VIII of England
 Saint Dominic
 St. Thomas Aquinas
 Third Order of St. Dominic
 Thought of Thomas Aquinas
 The English Dominicans

References

History of Shropshire
Shrewsbury
2005 books